Clayton Jones may refer to:

Clayton M. Jones (born 1952), American business chairman
Clay Jones (cartoonist) (born 1966), American editorial cartoonist

See also
Louis Clayton Jones (born 1935-2006), American attorney and civil rights leader
Clay Jones (disambiguation)